Miłosławice  is a village in the administrative district of Gmina Milicz, within Milicz County, Lower Silesian Voivodeship, in south-western Poland.

Transport
Miłosławice is inaccessible by rail. It is accessible by the 439 road, which runs through the village.

References

Villages in Milicz County